The Brazilian Women's Volleyball Superliga 2020–21 - Serie A was the 26th edition of this competition organized by the Brazilian Volleyball Confederation through the National Competitions Unit. It would also be the 42nd edition of the Brazilian Women's Volleyball Championship, the main competition between women's volleyball clubs in Brazil.

Regulation 

The qualifying phase of the competition is disputed by twelve teams in two rounds. In each turn, all teams will play each other only once. The games in the second round will be played in the same order as the first, only with the court control reversed.

The top eight clubs qualify for the play-offs. At this stage, a 3-0 or 3–1 victory guarantees three points for the winner and no points for the loser. With a score of 3–2, the winner of the match adds two points and the loser one. The last two placed will be relegated to the Series B 2020.

In the following order the tiebreaker criteria will be: number of wins, sets average, points average; direct confrontation (in the case of a tie between two teams) and last draw. The play-offs will be divided into three phases - quarter-finals, semi-finals and final.

In the quarter-finals there will be a cross between the teams with the best technical indexes following the logic: 1st x 8th (A); 2nd x 7th(B); 3rd x 6th (C) and 4th x 5th (D). These will play best of 3 matches (games), with a field command for each and the tiebreaker, if necessary, in the gym of the team with the best technical index of the qualifying phase.

The semi-finals will be disputed by the teams that passed the quarter-finals, following the logic: winner of duel A vs. winner of duel D; winner of duel B x winner of duel C. These will again play best of 3 (games), with a field command for each and the tiebreaker, if necessary, in the gym of the team with the best technical index of the qualifying phase .

The winners qualify for the final, which will be best of 3 games in the first place status of the qualifying round. The third and fourth places were defined by the best technical index of the qualifying phase.

The tournament sets were played up to 25 points with a minimum difference of two points (with the exception of the fifth set, which was won by the team that scored 15 points with at least two points difference). There were technical stops on the 8th and 16th points of the team that reached them first.

Participating teams 

Twelve teams dispute the title of the Women's Superliga 2020/2021-Series A. They are:

 Grades
 The São Paulo FC team will partner with Barueri.
 Pinhais, 4th place inherited the vacancies of Itajaí and ADC Bradesco, respectively 2nd and 3rd place in the Brazilian Women's Volleyball Superliga 2020 - Series B and due to the withdrawal of Valinhos.
 The FLA and SESC who finished last season 2nd and 10th respectively merged.
 São Caetano was relegated, but due to the withdrawal of Itajaí, ADC Bradesco and Valinhos it remained in the elite.

Qualifying stage

Rating 
 Win by 3 sets to 0 or 3 to 1: 3 points for the winner;
 Win by 3 sets to 2: 2 points for the winner and 1 point for the loser.
 No show, the team loses 2 points.
 In case of equality on points, the following criteria serve as a tiebreaker: number of victories, set ratio and rally ratio.

Shift 

 Location: The teams on the left side of the table play at home.

1st Round 

|}

Round 11 

|}

Return 

 Location: The teams on the left side of the table play at home.

1st Round 

|}

2nd Round 

|}

3rd Round 

|}

End 

Location: The games take place at the CDV in Saquarema.

Game 1 

|}

Game 2 

|}

Game 3 

|}

Awards

Superliga Selection 
The athletes who stood out individually were

Final classification

Statistics

Highest Scorer

All points scored | Source: CBV

Best Blocker

Points scored with winning blocks | Source: CBV

Best Servers

Points scored in the serve ace | Source: CBV

References

Women's volleyball in Brazil